Raynham Place (called Raynham Park in some documents) is a proposed MBTA Commuter Rail station in Raynham, Massachusetts. Under current plans, it would be constructed behind the Raynham Park racing center north of downtown Raynham and open in 2030 as part of the second phase of the South Coast Rail project.

History

The Dighton and Somerset Railroad opened through Raynham in 1866. Raynham station was located in the village of North Raynham where the line crossed Broadway. In 1882, the Old Colony Railroad opened the Raynham Branch from the station to Whittendon Junction, allowing trains to use Taunton Central station instead of Dean Street station. Service was gradually rerouted onto the new branch; Raynham ceased to be a junction in 1932 when rails were removed between the station and Dean Street. The New Haven Railroad ended passenger service to Fall River and New Bedford via Raynham in 1958.

A new MBTA Commuter Rail station, Raynham Place, is proposed to be built by 2030 as part of the second phase of the South Coast Rail project. An 800-foot-long high-level island platform serving two tracks would be constructed next to an access road behind the Raynham Park racing center, two miles north of the former station site. Current plans have a pedestrian bridge crossing the tracks from the middle of the platform; a previous design placed the bridge at the north end of the platform.

References

MBTA Commuter Rail stations in Bristol County, Massachusetts
Raynham, Massachusetts
Railway stations scheduled to open in 2030
Proposed MBTA Commuter Rail stations